Grecia Virgilia Herrada García (born ) was a Peruvian female volleyball player.

She was part of the Peru women's national volleyball team at the 2010 FIVB Volleyball Women's World Championship in Japan. She played with Deportivo Géminis.

Clubs
  Deportivo Géminis (2010)

References

External links
 Profile at bolivarianos2013.pe
  peru.com
  elcomercio.pe

1993 births
Living people
Peruvian women's volleyball players
Volleyball players at the 2010 Summer Youth Olympics
21st-century Peruvian women